Richard James Edward Hindley (born 25 April 1975 in Portsmouth, Hampshire) is a retired English cricketer. Hindley is a left-handed batsman who bowls right-arm Off-break.

Hindley made his List-A debut for the Hampshire Cricket Board in the 2001 Cheltenham and Gloucester Trophy against the Kent Cricket Board. Hindley went on to represent Hampshire in a single first-class match in 2003 against Glamorgan where he made a half-century  on debut, scoring 68* in Hampshire's second innings. At the end of the 2003 season he was released by the club.

Since his exit from professional cricket, he has become the head of coaching at Serious Cricket and he coaches youth district and county level sides .

External links
Richard Hindley on Cricinfo
Richard Hindley on CricketArchive

1975 births
Living people
Cricketers from Portsmouth
English cricketers
Hampshire cricketers
Hampshire Cricket Board cricketers